Kuwait Sporting Club, shortly known as Kuwait SC, is a Kuwaiti professional basketball club. The club competes in the Kuwaiti Division I Basketball League. Kuwait SC has won the Arab Club Basketball Championship once, in 2022 and is the first team from Kuwait to win an Arab title. The club has traditionally provided Kuwait's national basketball team with key players.

Honours

National competitions
Kuwaiti Division 1 League
Champions (7): 2004, 2014, 2015, 2017, 2020, 2021, 2022
Kuwaiti Cup of Martyr Fahed al Ahmad
Winners (1): 2004
Kuwaiti Federation Cup
Winners (3): 2009, 2013, 2020
Kuwaiti SuperCup
Winners (1): 2020

International competitions
Arab Clubs Championship
Winners (1): 2022
Runners-up (1): 2021

Notable players

 Jasmin Perković
 Elmedin Kikanović
 A.J. Slaughter
 James Feldeine
 Cady Lalanne
 Marcus Georges-Hunt

See also
Kuwait SC

References

External links
Asia-Basket.com Team Page
http://www.asia-basket.com/Kuwait/news/455267/Coach-Vanja-Gusa-(EX-Kazma)-agreed-terms-with-Al-Kuwait-SC-!!-

Basketball teams in Kuwait
Basketball teams established in 1960
Sport in Kuwait City